10th Anniversary: Rap-A-Lot Records is a compilation album released by Rap-a-Lot Records to celebrate the label's tenth anniversary. The compilation contained 11 hits from the likes of the Geto Boys, Scarface and the 5th Ward Boyz, as well as two previously unreleased songs ("Sunshine" by Scarface and "Don't Give No..." by Do or Die). Former 1 of the Girls member, Nina Creque, daughter of jazz musician Neal Creque, is featured on the previously unreleased "Sunshine" by Scarface.

10 Anniversary peaked at 48 on the Top R&B/Hip-Hop Albums.

Track listing

Charts

References 

1996 compilation albums
Rap-A-Lot Records compilation albums
Record label compilation albums
Hip hop compilation albums
Gangsta rap compilation albums